Grete Pedersen (born 1960) is a Norwegian choral conductor and former footballer.

Career in music
She is noted for her work with Det Norske Solistkor which she has conducted since 1990. She often features Scandinavian repertoire, but her recordings include a critically acclaimed version of the Bach motets.
She has also worked as a guest conductor abroad, for example with the BBC Singers (the BBC's professional chamber choir).

She is on the staff of the Norwegian Academy of Music and is the artistic director and principal conductor of the Carmel Bach Festival.

Awards
She is a recipient of the Norwegian Music Critics Award.
Her recording of the Bach motets on BIS received a Diapason d'Or in 2018.

References

1960 births
21st-century conductors (music)
Norwegian choral conductors
Women conductors (music)
Living people